Kaiparambu  is a village in Thrissur district in the state of Kerala, India.

Demographics
 India census, Kaiparambu had a population of 6968 with 3398 males and 3570 females.

Kaiparambu is a village belonging to Kaiparamba panchayat. This village is on the way to Thrissur to Kunnamkulam or Guruvayoor. The name Kaiparamba means a land in the shape of a hand. Where both sides of this village is islanded by paddy fields.

Kaiparambu have two local temple one is Kaiparambu Kavu temple and another Puthoor Subramanya and Siva temple. Kaiparambu is home land for lot of self-employed transport owners, like MKK travels, PAR travels, Vijay transport diamond cutting and polishing workers, farmers. The village was a hub of diamond cutting and polishing small scale industry in kerala.

Kaiparambu stays as a high land compared to its neighboring villages Mazhuvancheri and Ezhamkallu. The "Kaiparambu Erakkam" - slope is famous for its climb which is about three-fourths of a kilometer.

References

Villages in Thrissur district